The Venice Beach Skatepark is a public skatepark located in Venice, Los Angeles. It opened in late 2009.

History 
Venice Beach has been host to a number of well known skate spots throughout the history of skateboarding. From the backyard bowls to the concrete plaza covered in graffiti, the landscapes of Venice, California were integral to the development of skateboarding. Starting in the 2000s, a group of Venice locals, headed by Jesse Martinez, organized an effort to build the Venice Beach Skatepark.

In April 2020, the park was covered in sand to discourage gatherings during the COVID-19 pandemic.

References

External links 
 LA Parks Website - Venice Skate Park
 Video of Venice Skate Park filled with sand during the Covid-19 pandemic

2009 establishments in California
Olympic skateboarding venues
Skateparks in the United States
Sports venues completed in 2009
Venice, Los Angeles
Venues of the 2028 Summer Olympics